The Saint-Tropez Open is a professional tennis tournament played on hard courts. It is currently part of the ATP Challenger Tour. It is held annually in Saint-Tropez, France since 2021.

Past finals

Singles

Doubles

References

ATP Challenger Tour
Hard court tennis tournaments
Tennis tournaments in France
Saint-Tropez